Tell Your Friends is the third and final album by Mary Prankster.

Track listing
All songs by Mary Prankster
 "Brave New Baby" – 2:51
 "La Resistance" – 3:55
 "Tell Your Friends (Part One)" – 2:43
 "Sun" – 2:31
 "Irresponsible Woman" – 2:50
 "Arm's Length" – 3:56
 "Spill" – 3:32
 "None for Me" – 3:16
 "Tell Your Friends (Part Deux)" – 2:47
 "Darlin'" – 2:50

Personnel
 Mary Prankster – vocals, guitar, chamberlin, cowbell
 Jon E. Cakes – bass guitar, organ, tambourine; lead guitar on "La Resistance"
 Phil Tang – drums, timpani, glockenspiel, marimba
 Mitch Easter – lead guitar, additional guitars, engineering
 Jon M. Thornton – horn arrangement, trumpet, flugelhorn
 Tim Gordon – clarinet, tenor sax
 Rick Blanc – trombone, bass trombone
 Cliff Retallick – piano
 The Baltimore Sound Machine – additional percussion on "Spill"
 Mark Williams – engineering

References

Mary Prankster albums
2002 albums